The 193rd New York State Legislature, consisting of the New York State Senate and the New York State Assembly, met from January 6, 1999, to December 31, 2000, during the fifth and sixth years of George Pataki's governorship, in Albany.

Background
Under the provisions of the New York Constitution of 1938 and the U.S. Supreme Court decision to follow the One man, one vote rule, re-apportioned in 1992 by the Legislature, 61 Senators and 150 assemblymen were elected in single-seat districts for two-year terms. Senate and Assembly districts consisted of approximately the same number of inhabitants, the area being apportioned contiguously without restrictions regarding county boundaries.

Elections
The New York state election, 1998, was held on November 3.

Sessions
The Legislature met for the first regular session (the 222md) at the State Capitol in Albany on January 6, 1999; and recessed indefinitely on

Sheldon Silver (Dem.) was re-elected Speaker of the Assembly.

Joseph Bruno (Rep.) was re-elected Temporary President of the Senate.

The Legislature met for the second regular session (the 223rd) at the State Capitol in Albany on January 5, 2000; and recessed indefinitely on

State Senate

Senators
The asterisk (*) denotes members of the previous Legislature who continued in office as members of this Legislature. John Bonacic and Patricia McGee changed from the Assembly to the Senate at the beginning of this legislature.

Note: For brevity, the chairmanships omit the words "...the Committee on (the)..."

Employees
 Secretary:

State Assembly

Assembly members
The asterisk (*) denotes members of the previous Legislature who continued in office as members of this Legislature.

Note: For brevity, the chairmanships omit the words "...the Committee on (the)..."

Employees
 Clerk: Francine Misasi

Notes

Sources
 Senate election results at NYS Board of Elections
 Assembly election results  at NYS Board of Elections

193
1999 politics in New York (state)
2000 politics in New York (state)
1999 U.S. legislative sessions
2000 U.S. legislative sessions